= NAC stadion Heuvelstraat =

Football stadium in Breda, Netherlands

NAC Stadion Heuvelstraat
- Stadion aan de Heuvelstraat, Heuvelstraat stadion
- Interactive map of NAC Stadion Heuvelstraat
- Location: Postillonstraat 45; 4813 EW Breda; Netherlands
- Coordinates: 51°34′35″N 4°44′45″E
- Owner: City of Breda
- Operator: RKSV Groen Wit
- Capacity: 5,500
- Surface: Grass

Construction
- Groundbreaking: April 1931
- Built: April 1931
- Opened: August 30, 1931

Tenant
- NAC Breda (1931 - 1940); RKSV Groen Wit

NAC Stadion Heuvelstraat is a football stadium in Breda, Netherlands. It is used for football matches, hosted the home matches of NAC Breda and is now homeground of RKSV Groen Wit. The stadium was able to hold 5,500 people and opened in 1931.
